Mary Beth Harrell is an attorney in Killeen and Gatesville, Texas. She serves as the president of the Coryell County Economic Development Board and is often quoted in the Killeen Daily Herald.

She used to host and produce Insight, a television talk show on KNCT featuring panel discussions on a wide range of topics including: politics, religion, career and family. Harrell selects "prominent, successful women" from the Waco/Killeen/Temple media market as panelists, and solicits reactions to recorded clips of area residents' comments and questions. The first of twelve episodes debuted July 12, 2007.

Political career 

Harrell was the Democratic nominee challenging John Carter (R-Round Rock) for United States Representative in Texas' 31st congressional district. Of all Congressional challengers in 2006, Harrell was the only woman with a son serving on active military duty in the Iraq War. 

The Austin American-Statesman and The Austin Chronicle editorial boards both endorsed Harrell. Harrell was the only challenger that the Austin American-Statesman endorsed in advance of the 2006 elections. "Harrell is a moderate Democrat who has good ideas on the Iraq war and health care, and sensible positions on immigration and federal spending. District 31 voters should send a message to Carter about arrogance and insensitivity and elect Harrell," the paper wrote.

The Austin Chronicle blasted Carter's "incompetent, knee-jerk representation" and praised Harrell's "sensible exit strategy from Bush's war that involves not 'cutting and running' but replacing our troops with a true international peacekeeping force and setting 'achievable' benchmarks for the Iraqi government."

On November 3, 2006, most PBS affiliates broadcast a NOW episode entitled "Sway the Course?", a report of the impact of the Iraq War on election campaigns. The report included interviews with Harrell and Carter, as well as a number of Republican voters who declared their intention to vote for Harrell. The show did not air on KNCT  at the same time as it was scheduled at other PBS affiliates, but was aired on November 6, 2006, after the program was reviewed by media.

Federal Elections Commission filings indicate that Carter outspent Harrell more than four to one. Carter defeated Harrell by more than 30,000 votes, a 58 to 39 percent margin.

She was city prosecutor in Nolanville and Temple, Texas from 2004 until 2006.

Education and family 

Harrell was born December 14, 1956, in Manhattan. She earned a B.S. in history at Caldwell College, and a J.D. at St. Mary's University, Texas School of Law in 1998. 

Harrell was a solo practitioner with the law office of M. B. Harrell from 1998 through 2006. Harrell is the chief operator at Assisi Animal Refuge. She is married to local businessman Bob Harrell and has three children: Josh Harrell, Rob Harrell and Tonya Rosas. Both of her sons are currently serving on active duty in the United States Army. The oldest remains deployed in Iraq with the 4th Infantry Division (United States). Mary Beth and Bob Harrell currently reside in Gatesville, Texas.

References 

1946 births
Living people
People from Manhattan
Texas Democrats
American television talk show hosts
People from Gatesville, Texas